This is a list of international visits made by Amir Khan Muttaqi while serving as Acting Foreign Minister of Afghanistan, a position he has held since the Taliban's takeover of Afghanistan in 2021. Muttaqi is on a list of Taliban officials sanctioned under United Nations Security Council Resolution 1988, which includes a travel ban, though he was among 13 members given a waiver allowing for travel. Though it had previously been extended multiple times, the Security Council did not renew the waiver on August 19, 2022, calling into question Muttaqi's continued ability to make trips abroad.

Table

References

Afghanistan diplomacy-related lists
Lists of diplomatic trips
Taliban activities